The 1966–67 NHL season was the 50th season of the National Hockey League. This was the last season of only six teams in the NHL, as six more teams were added for the 1967–68 season. This season saw the debut of one of the greatest players in hockey history, defenceman Bobby Orr of the Boston Bruins. The Toronto Maple Leafs defeated the Montreal Canadiens four games to two in the 1967 Stanley Cup Finals to win their thirteenth Stanley Cup in franchise history; to date this was the Leafs' last Stanley Cup victory.

League business
President David Molson of the Canadian Arena Company announced that the Montreal Forum would undergo major alterations in a $5 million work program commencing in April 1968.

NHL president Clarence Campbell and Canadian Amateur Hockey Association (CAHA) president Fred Page announced a new five-year professional-agreement effective on July 1, 1967. The direct sponsorship of junior ice hockey teams by the NHL was to be phased out in the upcoming year, and no new sponsored players could be registered or be required to sign a contract restricting movement between teams. The agreement eliminated the A, B and C forms, which had angered the parents of amateur players and were the source of legal action threats when the professional team refused to release a player. Page succeeded in getting junior-aged players to be eligible for the NHL Amateur Draft once they graduate from junior hockey, or to be signed as a free agent in the year the player reaches his 20th birthday. The NHL agreed to pay development fees to the CAHA for the drafted players, and it allowed the CAHA to distribute the fees. The new agreement came at a time that also leveled the playing field for new NHL clubs in the 1967 NHL expansion.

Regular season
Bobby Orr made his NHL debut on October 19, with an assist in a 6–2 win over Detroit.

The New York Rangers got off  to a slow start and in one game, poor Eddie Giacomin became a target for Madison Square Garden fans abuse
as they pelted him with garbage in a game with Boston. From there, however, he began to win and the fans cheered their approval. For a time, the Rangers were in first place, but faded down the stretch and finished fourth.

Terry Sawchuk got his 99th shutout when Toronto blanked Detroit 4–0 on February 25. He got his 100th career shutout on March 4, when Toronto defeated Chicago 4–0.

Bobby Hull scored his 50th goal of the season when Chicago lost to Toronto 9–5 on March 18 at Maple Leaf Gardens. Another superlative for the Black Hawks was Stan Mikita, who tied the league scoring record with 97 points in claiming the Art Ross Trophy for the third time. Mikita was also awarded the Hart Memorial Trophy as most valuable player.

The Chicago Black Hawks, who had won three Stanley Cups, finished first overall in the standings for the first time in their history, a full seventeen points ahead of the Montreal Canadiens and nineteen ahead of the Toronto Maple Leafs.

The Boston Bruins missed the playoffs, their last time before their record 29-season playoff streak.

Final standings

Playoffs

Playoff bracket

Semifinals

(1) Chicago Black Hawks vs. (3) Toronto Maple Leafs
Despite Chicago's impressive regular season marks, it was the third seed Toronto Maple Leafs who beat the Black Hawks in the first round of the playoffs.

(2) Montreal Canadiens vs. (4) New York Rangers
Montreal swept the Rangers in four games.

Stanley Cup Finals

Awards

All-Star teams

Player statistics

Scoring leaders
Note: GP = Games played; G = Goals; A = Assists; Pts = Points

Source: NHL.

Leading goaltenders
Note: GP = Games played; Min = Minutes played; GA = Goals against; GAA = Goals against average; W = Wins; L = Losses; T = Ties; SO = Shutouts

Coaches
Boston Bruins: Harry Sinden
Chicago Black Hawks: Billy Reay
Detroit Red Wings: Sid Abel
Montreal Canadiens: Toe Blake
New York Rangers: Emile Francis
Toronto Maple Leafs: Punch Imlach

Debuts
The following is a list of players of note who played their first NHL game in 1966–67 (listed with their first team, asterisk(*) marks debut in playoffs):
Bobby Orr, Boston Bruins
Glen Sather, Boston Bruins
Ed Van Impe, Chicago Black Hawks
Carol Vadnais, Montreal Canadiens
Serge Savard, Montreal Canadiens
Rogie Vachon, Montreal Canadiens

Last games
The following is a list of players of note that played their last game in the NHL in 1966–67 (listed with their last team):
Bill Hay, Chicago Black Hawks
Red Kelly, Toronto Maple Leafs

See also 
 1966-67 NHL transactions
 1967 NHL Expansion
 List of Stanley Cup champions
 1966 NHL Amateur Draft
 20th National Hockey League All-Star Game
 National Hockey League All-Star Game
 1966 in sports
 1967 in sports

References 
 
 
 
 
 
 

Notes

External links
 Hockey Database
 NHL.com
 

 
1966–67 in American ice hockey by league
1966–67 in Canadian ice hockey by league